Malvern station is a SEPTA Regional Rail and a former Amtrak station in Malvern, Pennsylvania. Located at West King Road and North Warren Avenue, it serves most Paoli/Thorndale Line trains. Until 1998, some Keystone Service trains stopped here as well.

There are 323 parking spaces at the station for daily parking. This station is 21.8 track miles from Philadelphia's Suburban Station. In 2017, the average total weekday boardings at this station was 811, and the average total weekday alightings was 825. Malvern is also the western terminal of the line on Sundays.

History
The station was originally built in 1900 by the Pennsylvania Railroad. In 1968, it merged with its longtime rival New York Central Railroad to form the Penn Central Railroad. With railroad passenger service declining in the United States, passenger service was acquired by Amtrak in 1971 which ran Keystone and Keystone State Express trains. Penn Central continued to struggle to provide commuter service until it was acquired by Conrail in 1976, and SEPTA in 1983. SEPTA designated this as the R5 Paoli/Thorndale line.

In 2010 SEPTA began construction of a new passenger access tunnel along with handicap ramps and stairways to the platforms. The project included improved parking lots. SEPTA has received frequent criticism for spending $9.2 million to build the ramps because there is currently no way for a person in a wheelchair to get from the platform to the train. A person in a wheelchair, as of now, could only get from the parking lot to the station platform.

Station layout
Malvern has two low-level side platforms. Some SEPTA trains terminate/originate here.

Gallery

References

External links
SEPTA – Malvern Station
Old PRR Malvern Station photos
 Station from Google Maps Street View

SEPTA Regional Rail stations
Former Pennsylvania Railroad stations
Railway stations in Chester County, Pennsylvania
Railway stations in the United States opened in 1900
Philadelphia to Harrisburg Main Line